Vasiliki "Vasso" Karantasiou (also transliterated Karadassiou; born January 6, 1973) is a female beach volleyball player from Greece, who won the gold medal at the 2005 European Championships in Moscow, Russia, partnering Vassiliki Arvaniti. 

She was born in Athens, Greece, and represented her native country at the 2004 Summer Olympics in her home city, after having competed at the 2000 Summer Olympics as well.

Individual awards
 FIVB Top Women's Player 2005

Playing partners
Vassiliki Arvaniti
Efthalia Koutroumanidou
 Efi Sfyri
 Stavroula Theodorou
 Rodi Ordoulidou

References

External links
 
 
 

1973 births
Living people
Greek beach volleyball players
Beach volleyball players at the 2000 Summer Olympics
Beach volleyball players at the 2004 Summer Olympics
Beach volleyball players at the 2008 Summer Olympics
Olympic beach volleyball players of Greece
Sportspeople from Athens
Greek sportswomen
Women's beach volleyball players